Kamila Bobr (born 7 May 1997) is a Belarusian sprint canoeist.

She participated at the 2018 ICF Canoe Sprint World Championships.

References

1997 births
Living people
Belarusian female canoeists
ICF Canoe Sprint World Championships medalists in Canadian
Canoeists at the 2014 Summer Youth Olympics
Youth Olympic gold medalists for Belarus
21st-century Belarusian women